Vitaliy Volodymyrovych Kolyesnikov (born 8 December 1988) is a Ukrainian footballer who plays as a forward.

Playing career 
Kolesnikov played in the Ukrainian Second League in 2012 with Stal Kamianske. The following season he played with FC Myr Hornostayivka, and later with FC Inhulets Petrove. In 2016, he featured in the Ukrainian First League after Inhulets Petrove secured promotion, and he also saw action with FC Inhulets-2 Petrove. In 2017, he returned to FC Myr, and finished the season with FC Polissya Zhytomyr. 

In 2018, he played abroad in the Canadian Soccer League with CSC Mississauga. During the winter season he signed with Ukraine AC in the Arena Premier League. In 2021, he played in the Ontario Soccer League with Hungaria Vasas.

References

External links
 
 

1988 births
Living people
Footballers from Chernihiv
Ukrainian footballers
FC Yednist Plysky players
FC Stal Kamianske players
FC Myr Hornostayivka players
FC Inhulets Petrove players
FC Inhulets-2 Petrove players
FC Polissya Zhytomyr players
Toronto Atomic FC players
Canadian Soccer League (1998–present) players
Association football forwards
Ukrainian First League players
Ukrainian Second League players